Africans in Poland, also known as Afro-Poles or Afro-Polish, are citizens or residents of Poland who are of African descent.

History
The origins of the Afro-Polish community are rooted in educational immigration to the Polish People's Republic. The Communist government strongly supported anti-colonial movements in Africa as part of broader Soviet policy. From the 1950s to the 1980s, many Africans emigrated to Poland to pursue their educations. While most African students in Poland returned to their countries of origin, many decided to remain in Poland and acquire citizenship. The contemporary Afro-Polish community is composed of many of these Africans and their descendants.

In 1955, the 5th World Festival of Youth and Students was held in Warsaw. Organized by the leftist, anti-imperialist World Federation of Democratic Youth, the festival invited thousands of delegates from around the world, including almost 1,000 Africans. The Communist leadership of Poland wished to express solidarity and promote socialism to Africans from colonized nations. This was one of the earliest Polish encounters with non-white people, following the end of the multicultural and multiethnic Second Polish Republic following World War II. The Polish Press Agency was given the task of documenting the African visitors, which began an ongoing series of Polish press photography depicting African visitors and residents of Poland.

Notable Afro-Polish citizens or residents

Entertainment and media
Mamadou Diouf – Senegalese-born musician
 Robert El Gendy - journalist and television personality of Egyptian descent
Sara James – Polish-born singer of Nigerian descent
Patricia Kazadi – Polish-born actress of Congolese descent 
Omenaa Mensah – Polish-born TV presenter of Ghanaian descent 
August Agbola O'Browne - Jazz drummer, Polish resistance member
Omar Sangare –  Polish American actor, academic, poet, and theatre director
Patrycja Soliman - Actress, Egyptian father
Aleksandra Szwed – Polish-born actress of Nigerian descent 
Ifi Ude – Nigerian-born singer

Military
Władysław Franciszek Jabłonowski – Polish-born Napoleonic General of English and African descent

Political and social activists
Killion Munyama – Zambian-born Civic Platform member of the Sejm
John Godson – Nigerian-born Polish People's Party member of the Sejm
Krystian Legierski - LGBT activist, of Polish and Mauritanian descent

Sportsmen

Babatunde Aiyegbusi – Polish-born professional wrestler of Nigerian descent
Michael Ameyaw - Footballer of Ghanaian descent
Ishmael Baidoo - Ghanaian footballer
Ferdinand Chi Fon - Cameroon-born retired footballer
Martins Ekwueme - Nigerian footballer
Sofia Ennaoui - Athlete, Moroccan father
Kelechi Iheanacho - Nigerian footballer
Benjamin Imeh - Nigerian footballer
Maxwell Kalu - Nigerian footballer
Thomas Kelati - Basketball player of Eritrean heritage
Tafara Madembo - Footballer of Zimbabwean descent
Robert Mitwerandu - Footballer of Zimbabwean descent
Alain Ngamayama - Footballer of Congolese descent
Emmanuel Olisadebe - Nigerian-born footballer
Natalia Padilla - Footballer of Moroccan descent
Artur Partyka - Former high jumper, Algerian father
Yared Shegumo – Ethiopian-born distance runner, who specializes in the Marathon
Jeremy Sochan - Polish-American basketball player
Mouhamadou Traoré - Senegalese footballer
Stanley Udenkwor - Former footballer of Nigerian descent
Izu Ugonoh – Polish-born boxer of Nigerian descent

Other
Abdulcadir Gabeire Farah – Somalian-born historian and social activist.
Maxwell Itoya – Nigerian immigrant in Poland, who was killed in a police raid on a flea market.
Simon Mol - Cameroonian anti-racism activist arrested for knowingly spreading HIV virus 
Eduard von Feuchtersleben - Engineer and writer

See also

Murzyn
Murzynek Bambo

Notes

References 

 
Ethnic groups in Poland
Polish people of African descent